Cutforth is a surname. Notable people with the surname include:

Lancelot Eric Cutforth (1899–1980), British Army officer
René Cutforth (1909–1984), British journalist, television and radio broadcaster, and writer